Datuk Wira Poh Ah Tiam (April 1, 1952 – March 15, 2007) was a Malaysian politician, businessman and community leader of Chinese descent. Poh was born in Kampung Belimbing, near Durian Tunggal, Malacca. He and his family moved to nearby Machap Baru, where Poh in later years contributed significantly to the small town's development.

After working as a teacher and later venturing into business, Poh stood as a state assembly candidate for Pulau Sebang in the 1986 General Elections and won, beginning his political career. He was the Malacca state Malaysian Chinese Association (MCA) and the Malacca State Housing and Local Government Committee Chairman, as well as the Malacca state assemblyman for Pulau Sebang (1986-1995), Bukit Sedanan (1995-2004) and Machap (2004-2007). During his tenure, the Machap Baru town saw extensive development, with new housing and public facilities constructed.

Poh died on 15 March 2007 at the Pantai Hospital Malacca due to renal failure arising from lymphatic cancer, triggered a by-election in Machap on 12 April 2007, which elects Lai Meng Chong of Malaysian Chinese Association, Barisan Nasional as its assemblyman. Following his death, a highway and a recreational park in Machap Baru were built and named after him to commemorate his contribution to the state.

Election results

References 

1952 births
2007 deaths
Malaysian politicians of Chinese descent
Malaysian Chinese Association politicians
Members of the Malacca State Legislative Assembly